Ramesh Sippy (born 23 January 1947) is an Indian film director, actor and producer in Hindi cinema. He is particularly known for directing Sholay (1975), which is regarded as one of the most influential Indian film ever made.   The Government of India honoured him with Padma Shri in 2013.

In the year 2017, he founded Ramesh Sippy Academy of Cinema & Entertainment in Mumbai.

Personal life
Sippy's father was producer G. P. Sippy. Ramesh Sippy has been married twice; his current wife is actress Kiran Juneja. With his first wife, Geeta, he has 3 children. His son Rohan Sippy is a film director. His daughter Sheena was once married to Shashi Kapoor's son, Kunal Kapoor until they divorced in 2004.

Career

Ramesh Sippy visited the sets of the film Sazaa, his father's first film, when he was 6 years old. His first film job came at age nine, when he played Achala Sachdev's son in the 1953 film Shahenshah. He worked in both the production and direction departments in films like Johar-Mehmood in Goa and Mere Sanam, which his father was producing. He worked for 7 years as an assistant before becoming the director of Andaz, in 1971 which starred Shammi Kapoor, Hema Malini and Rajesh Khanna and was a box office success. His second film Seeta Aur Geeta (1972), featuring Hema Malini playing dual roles was highly successful and propelled Malini to superstardom

In 1975, he directed Sholay featuring an ensemble cast including Dharmendra, Amitabh Bachchan, Sanjeev Kumar and Amjad Khan in his most iconic role as the dacoit Gabbar Singh. After a lukewarm start the box office, the film went on to become the biggest blockbuster in Bollywood film history. Sholay still remains one of the most iconic films in Hindi film history and a favourite for Hindi film audiences globally.

None of his later films were able to match the success of Sholay. While Sholay was a tribute to the Westerns, his next film Shaan in 1980 was inspired by the James Bond films but was only a moderate success. In 1982, he brought together veteran actor Dilip Kumar and the reigning superstar of that era Amitabh Bachchan in Shakti. While the film was only moderately successful, it won the Filmfare Best Movie Award. In 1985, he directed Saagar, which starred Rishi Kapoor, Kamal Haasan and marked Dimple Kapadia's comeback to films after 12 years since her debut film Bobby.

He directed a successful television serial titled Buniyaad which focused on the Partition of India and aired on Indian television channel Doordarshan from 1986 to 1987. The last three films he directed, Bhrashtachar (1989), Akayla (1991), and Zamana Deewana (1995) were box office flops. He did not direct any film for 20 years.

His string of hits with Amitabh Bachchan made him one of the golden directors who had a special working relationship with the actor, (Yash Chopra, Prakash Mehra, Manmohan Desai, and Hrishikesh Mukherjee being the other four). In 2005 he received the Filmfare Best Film of 50 Years award for his legendary film, Sholay.

He has produced films directed by his son Rohan Sippy, such as Kuch Naa Kaho (2003), Bluffmaster (2005) and Dum Maro Dum (2011). In 2006 he produced Taxi No. 9211 which was directed by Milan Luthria. In 2008 he produced Kunaal Roy Kapur's The President is Coming as well as the Akshay Kumar-Deepika Padukone film, Chandni Chowk to China, directed by Nikhil Advani.

In 2015, he returned to directing after 20 years with his next film, Shimla Mirchi, a comedy film starring Rajkummar Rao, Rakul Preet Singh and Hema Malini. The film had difficulty attracting buyers and remained unreleased for five years. In January 2020, it was finally released on Netflix.

Awards and honours 
 Filmfare Best Film of 50 Years for Sholay in 2005
 IIFA Award for outstanding contribution to the Indian cinema (Male) in 2012
 Padma Shri in 2013
 Filmfare Lifetime Achievement Award in 2020.

Filmography

Director
 Shimla Mirchi (2020)
 Zamana Deewana (1995)
 Akayla (1991)
 Bhrashtachar (1989)
 Zameen (1987)
 Buniyaad (1986) television drama-series
 Saagar (1985)
 Shakti (1982)
 Shaan (1980)
 Sholay (1975)
 Seeta Aur Geeta (1972)
 Andaz (1971)

Producer
Sonali Cable (2014)
Nautanki Saala (2013)
Dum Maaro Dum (2011)
Chandni Chowk to China (2009)
Fear (2007)
Taxi No. 9211 (2006)
Bluffmaster! (2005)
Kuch Naa Kaho (2003)
Trishna (1978)
Brahmachari (1968)

Actor
 Shimla Mirchi (2020) as a person reading a book on the bench (guest appearance)

References

Sources

External links

 
 

1947 births
Living people
20th-century Indian film directors
Film producers from Mumbai
Hindi-language film directors
People from Karachi
Sindhi people
Recipients of the Padma Shri in arts
Film directors from Mumbai
Filmfare Lifetime Achievement Award winners